In mathematics, the Smith normal form (sometimes abbreviated SNF) is a normal form that can be defined for any matrix (not necessarily square) with entries in a principal ideal domain (PID).  The Smith normal form of a matrix is diagonal, and can be obtained from the original matrix by multiplying on the left and right by invertible square matrices.  In particular, the integers are a PID, so one can always calculate the Smith normal form of an integer matrix.  The Smith normal form is very useful for working with finitely generated modules over a PID, and in particular for deducing the structure of a quotient of a free module. It is named after the Irish mathematician Henry John Stephen Smith.

Definition

Let A be a nonzero m×n matrix over a principal ideal domain R. There exist invertible  and -matrices S, T (with coefficients in R) such that the product S A T is

and the diagonal elements  satisfy  for all . This is the Smith normal form of the matrix A. The elements  are unique up to multiplication by a unit and are called the elementary divisors, invariants, or invariant factors. They can be computed (up to multiplication by a unit) as
 

Algorithm 
The first goal is to find invertible square matrices  and  such that the product  is diagonal. This is the hardest part of the algorithm. Once diagonality is achieved, it becomes relatively easy to put the matrix into Smith normal form. Since row operations are left-multiplications and column operations are right-multiplications, this preserves the invariant  where  denote current values and  denotes the original matrix; eventually the matrices in this invariant become diagonal. Only invertible row and column operations are performed, which ensures that  and  remain invertible matrices.

In particular,  is also a Bézout domain, so it is a gcd domain and the gcd of any two elements satisfies a Bézout's identity.

Step I: Choosing a pivot

Our chosen pivot is now at position .

Step II: Improving the pivot
If there is an entry at position (k,jt) such that , then, letting , we know by the Bézout property that there exist σ, τ in R such that

By left-multiplication with an appropriate invertible matrix L, it can be achieved that row t of the matrix product is the sum of σ times the original row t and τ times the original row k, that row k of the product is another linear combination of those original rows, and that all other rows are unchanged.

so that the matrix

is invertible, with inverse

Now L can be obtained by fitting  into rows and columns t and k of the identity matrix. By construction the matrix obtained after left-multiplying by L has entry β at position (t,jt) (and due to our choice of α and γ it also has an entry 0 at position (k,jt), which is useful though not essential for the algorithm). This new entry β divides the entry  that was there before, and so in particular ; therefore repeating these steps must eventually terminate. One ends up with a matrix having an entry at position (t,jt) that divides all entries in column jt.

Step III: Eliminating entries
Finally, adding appropriate multiples of row t, it can be achieved that all entries in column jt except for that at position (t,jt) are zero. This can be achieved by left-multiplication with an appropriate matrix.  However, to make the matrix fully diagonal we need to eliminate nonzero entries on the row of position (t,jt) as well.  This can be achieved by repeating the steps in Step II for columns instead of rows, and using multiplication on the right by the transpose of the obtained matrix L.  In general this will result in the zero entries from the prior application of Step III becoming nonzero again.

At this point, only the block of A to the lower right of (t,jt) needs to be diagonalized, and conceptually the algorithm can be applied recursively, treating this block as a separate matrix. In other words, we can increment t by one and go back to Step I.

Final step
Applying the steps described above to the remaining non-zero columns of the resulting matrix (if any), we get an -matrix with column indices  where . The matrix entries  are non-zero, and every other entry is zero.

For short, set  for the element at position .

The condition of divisibility of diagonal entries might not be satisfied. Since the new entry at position  is a linear combination of the original , it is divisible by β.

The value  does not change by the above operation (it is δ of the determinant of the upper  submatrix), whence that operation does diminish (by moving prime factors to the right) the value of

So after finitely many applications of this operation no further application is possible, which means that we have obtained  as desired.

Since all row and column manipulations involved in the process are invertible, this shows that there exist invertible  and -matrices S, T so that the product S A T satisfies the definition of a Smith normal form. In particular, this shows that the Smith normal form exists, which was assumed without proof in the definition.

Applications 

The Smith normal form is useful for computing the homology of a chain complex when the chain modules of the chain complex are finitely generated.  For instance, in topology, it can be used to compute the homology of a finite simplicial complex or CW complex over the integers, because the boundary maps in such a complex are just integer matrices.  It can also be used to determine the invariant factors that occur in the structure theorem for finitely generated modules over a principal ideal domain, which includes the fundamental theorem of finitely generated abelian groups.

The Smith normal form is also used in control theory to compute transmission and blocking zeros of a transfer function matrix.

Example 
As an example, we will find the Smith normal form of the following matrix over the integers.

The following matrices are the intermediate steps as the algorithm is applied to the above matrix.

So the Smith normal form is

and the invariant factors are 2, 2 and 156.

Similarity 
The Smith normal form can be used to determine whether or not matrices with entries over a common field are similar. Specifically two matrices A and B are similar if and only if the characteristic matrices  and  have the same Smith normal form.

For example, with

A and B are similar because the Smith normal form of their characteristic matrices match, but are not similar to C because the Smith normal form of the characteristic matrices do not match.

See also 
 Canonical form
 Diophantine equation
 Elementary divisors
 Frobenius normal form (also called Rational canonical form)
 Hermite normal form
 Invariant factor
 Structure theorem for finitely generated modules over a principal ideal domain
 Singular value decomposition

Notes

References
  Reprinted (pp. 367–409) in The Collected Mathematical Papers of Henry John Stephen Smith, Vol. I, edited by J. W. L. Glaisher. Oxford: Clarendon Press (1894), xcv+603 pp.
 
 
 K. R. Matthews, Smith normal form. MP274: Linear Algebra, Lecture Notes, University of Queensland, 1991.

External links 

 An animated example of computation of Smith normal form.

Matrix theory
Matrix normal forms